Poojaikku Vandha Malar is a 1965 Indian Tamil-language film produced and directed by Muktha Srinivasan, and written by K. Balachander. The film stars Gemini Ganesan, Nagesh, R. Muthuraman and Savithri. It was released on 12 March 1965 and became a commercial success.

Plot 

Suresh and Ravi are close friends who, after a misunderstanding, become enemies. Suresh falls in love with Ravi's sister Chitra, unaware that she is the sister of his friend-turned enemy. Once aware, he breaks up with her and vows never to marry her. Undaunted and determined to marry Suresh, Chitra comes to his house to live with him. The misunderstanding is ultimately cleared, Suresh and Ravi reconcile, and Suresh marries Chitra.

Cast 
Male cast
 Gemini Ganesan as Suresh
 Nagesh as Panju
 R. Muthuraman as Ravi
 S. V. Sahasranamam as Ravi's father
 S. Rama Rao as Gothandam
 O. A. K. Thevar

Female cast
 Savitri as Chitra
 Pandari Bai as Suresh's mother
 Manimala as Maalã
 Manorama as Manju
Samikkannu as Textile shop owner
 Sandhya as Ravi and Chitra's mother
 Chitra Devi

Production 
Poojaikku Vandha Malar was directed by Muktha Srinivasan who also produced it under his own company Muktha Films, and written by K. Balachander.

Soundtrack 
The soundtrack and score were composed by Viswanathan–Ramamoorthy (a duo consisting of M. S. Viswanathan and T. K. Ramamoorthy), while the lyrics were written by Alangudi Somu and Vaali.

Release and reception 

Poojaikku Vantha Malar was released on 12 March 1965. The Indian Express stated, "Poojaikku Vantha Malar is not all roses. Nor is it mere paper. It is a mixed bunch, mildly fragrant, moderately attractive that can decorate the table if not adorn the head." The reviewer praised the performances of the cast, especially the comedy subplot featuring Nagesh as an absent-minded insurance agent, and the photography by Nemai Ghosh, but criticised the background score, climax and editing, concluding, "But director [Muktha] Srinivasan and writer K. Balachander are watchful enough to prevent Malar from withering away." The film was a commercial success.

References

External links 
 

1960s Tamil-language films
Films directed by Muktha Srinivasan
Films scored by Viswanathan–Ramamoorthy
Films with screenplays by K. Balachander